Fuentes Brotantes de Tlalpan National Park is a national park located in the Tlalpan district of southern Mexico City.

It was declared a National Park on 28 September 1936, on what was previously known as the Rancho Teochtíhuitl and the Barranca de los Manantiales.

Natural history
Most wildlife species that inhabit the park were brought and acclimatized to it, as a result of the donations from SEMARNAT and other animal welfare institutions.

The park's main characteristic are ponds, fed by a few springs flowing from the foothills of the Sierra del Ajusco.

Recreation
The park has landscaped areas, birdwatching, food stalls, and restaurants.

It is one of the more visited spots by the residents of the southern city area.

See also
National parks of Mexico

References

1936 establishments in Mexico
National parks of Mexico
Parks in Mexico City
Protected areas established in 1936
Tlalpan
Protected areas of the Trans-Mexican Volcanic Belt